Zoni (Greek: Ζώνη, Turkish: Çavuşkoy) is a village in the northern part of the Evros regional unit in Greece. Zoni is in the municipal unit of Kyprinos. In 2011 its population was 150 for the village and 449 for the municipal district, including the villages Chelidona and Mikra Doxipara. It is located close to the border with Bulgaria, south of Kyprinos village, and east of Ivaylovgrad, Bulgaria.  Zoni is on the Greek National Road 53 (Alexandroupoli - Aisymi - Mikro Dereio - Kyprinos - Ormenio).

Population

History
The village was founded by the Ottoman Turks. Its inhabitants were 3/4 Bulgarian and 1/4 Turkish before the village was annexed by Greece from Bulgaria in 1920 and before the aftermath of the Greco-Turkish War (1919-1922), when Greek refugees from Eastern Thrace and Asia Minor settled into the village.  Its Turkish name was changed to the current Zoni.

See also

List of settlements in the Evros regional unit

External links
Zoni on GTP Travel Pages

References

Populated places in Evros (regional unit)